Hurstbourne Acres is a home rule-class city in Jefferson County, Kentucky, United States. The population was 1,811 at the 2010 census, up from 1,504 at the 2000 census.

Geography
Hurstbourne Acres is located in east-central Jefferson County at  (38.220270, -85.590489). It is bordered to the southeast by Forest Hills, to the east and south by Jeffersontown, and to the north and west by the Louisville/Jefferson County consolidated government. Interstate 64 passes just north of the city, with access from Exit 15 (Hurstbourne Parkway).

Demographics

As of the census of 2000, there were 1,504 people, 909 households, and 309 families residing in the city. The racial makeup of the city was 80.78% White, 8.44% African American, 0.33% Native American, 7.45% Asian, 1.00% from other races, and 1.99% from two or more races. Hispanic or Latino of any race were 2.86% of the population.

There were 909 households, out of which 11.6% had children under the age of 18 living with them, 25.9% were married couples living together, 5.8% had a female householder with no husband present, and 66.0% were non-families. 54.8% of all households were made up of individuals, and 6.4% had someone living alone who was 65 years of age or older. The average household size was 1.65 and the average family size was 2.49.

In the city, the population was spread out, with 11.6% under the age of 18, 18.0% from 18 to 24, 43.2% from 25 to 44, 16.4% from 45 to 64, and 11.0% who were 65 years of age or older. The median age was 31 years. For every 100 females, there were 99.7 males. For every 100 females age 18 and over, there were 99.4 males.

The median income for a household in the city was $39,211, and the median income for a family was $58,125. Males had a median income of $38,558 versus $30,184 for females. The per capita income for the city was $27,238. About 2.0% of families and 5.8% of the population were below the poverty line, including 3.6% of those under age 18 and none of those age 65 or over.

References

External links
City of Hurstbourne Acres official website

Cities in Jefferson County, Kentucky
Cities in Kentucky
Populated places established in 1963
1963 establishments in Kentucky